Sir Thomas Grimes or Grahme  was an English politician who sat in the House of Commons between 1614 and 1624.

Grimes was the son of  Thomas Grimes, citizen and haberdasher of London and of Peckham and his wife Jane Muschamp daughter and co-heir of Thomas Muschamp, of Peckham.  He was knighted at Hanworth, Middlesex on 2 June 1603. He was J.P.  and Deputy Lieutenant of Surrey. In 1614, he was elected Member of Parliament for Haslemere. He was re-elected MP for Haslemere in 1621. In 1624 he was elected MP for Surrey. 
 
Grimes married  Margaret, daughter of Sir George More, of Loseley Park. Sir Thomas Grimes had a numerous family, mostly daughters. He was succeeded by his eldest son George.

References

Year of birth missing
Year of death missing
English MPs 1614
English MPs 1621–1622
English MPs 1624–1625